Columbus Wardner "Ward" Meyers (April 19, 1908 – April 6, 1987) was an American professional basketball player and coach. He played in the National Basketball League for the Indianapolis Kautskys during the 1939–40 season and averaged 2.0 points per game in two games played. That season he also served as the head coach. Meyers spent the majority of his playing career in the Fort Wayne, Indiana region, competing on semi-professional teams.

Head coaching record

|-
| align="left" |Indianapolis
| align="left" |1939–40
| 28||9||19||||align="center" |4th in Eastern||–||–||–||–|| align="center" |Missed playoffs
|-
|-class="sortbottom"
| align="center" colspan="2"|Total
| 28||9||19|||| ||–||–||–||–||

References

1908 births
1987 deaths
American Basketball League (1925–1955) players
American men's basketball coaches
American men's basketball players
Basketball coaches from Indiana
Basketball players from Indiana
Centers (basketball)
Indianapolis Kautskys coaches
Indianapolis Kautskys players
People from Huntington County, Indiana
Player-coaches